Gordon McLean Simpson (May 10, 1928 – July 11, 2019) was a Canadian ice hockey defenceman who played with the Winnipeg Maroons for 14 years. He was born in Winnipeg, Manitoba.

The Canadian Amateur Hockey Association merged the Canada men's national ice hockey team into the Maroons in 1965, and Simpson continued as coach. Father David Bauer, who had founded the national team, continued as its manager and saw the merger as the beginning of a truly national team based in the geographic centre of the country.

Awards and achievements
Allan Cup Championship (1964)
"Honoured Member" of the Manitoba Hockey Hall of Fame

References

External links

Gord Simpson’s biography at Manitoba Hockey Hall of Fame

1928 births
2019 deaths
Canada men's national ice hockey team coaches
Canadian ice hockey defencemen
Ice hockey people from Winnipeg
Winnipeg Monarchs players